This lists of law schools is organized by world region and then country.

Africa

Egypt 
 List of law schools in Egypt

Ghana
 Ghana School of Law

Liberia 
 Louis Arthur Grimes School of Law, University of Liberia

Nigeria
 Nigerian Law School
 Edwin Clark University Faculty of Law
 Abia State University Faculty of Law
 Adekunle Ajasin University Faculty of Law
 Ahmadu Bello University Faculty of Law
 Ambrose Alli University Faculty of Law
 Anambra State University Faculty of Law
 Bayero University Faculty of Law
 Benue State University Faculty of Law
 Delta State University Faculty of Law
 Ebonyi State University Faculty of Law
 Enugu State University Faculty of Law
 Igbinedion University Faculty of Law
 Imo State University Faculty of Law
 Kogi State University Faculty of Law
 Lagos State University Faculty of Law
 Madonna University Faculty of Law
 Nnamdi Azikiwe University Faculty of Law
 Obafemi Awolowo University Faculty of Law
 Olabisi Onabanjo University Faculty of Law
 Rivers State University Faculty of Law
 University of Abuja Faculty of Law
 Ekiti State University Faculty of Law
 University of Benin Faculty of Law
 University of Calabar Faculty of Law
 University of Ibadan Faculty of Law
 University of Ilorin Faculty of Law
 University of Jos Faculty of Law
 University of Lagos Faculty of Law
 University of Maiduguri Faculty of Law
 University of Nigeria Faculty of Law
 University of Uyo Faculty of Law
 Usman Danfodiyo University Faculty of Law
 Niger Delta University Faculty of Law
 Babcock University Faculty of Law
 Nasarawa State University Faculty of Law
 Benson Idahosa University Faculty of Law
 Osun State University Faculty of Law
 Afe Babalola University Faculty of Law
 Umaru Musa Yar'adua University Katsina Faculty of Law
 Justice Fati Lami Abubakar law school, Minna

South Africa 
 List of law schools in South Africa

Uganda
 List of law schools in Uganda

Asia

China 
 List of law schools in China

Hong Kong
 List of law schools in Hong Kong

India 
 List of law schools in India

Indonesia 
 Padjadjaran University
 University of Indonesia
 Gadjah Mada University
 Airlangga University
 Medan Area University
 Muhammadiyah University of North Sumatera
Atma Jaya Catholic University

Iraq 
 List of law schools in Iraq

Israel 
 List of law schools in Israel

Japan

Macau
 List of law schools in Macau

Malaysia

Public universities
 University of Malaya (UM)
 MARA University of Technology (UiTM)
 International Islamic University Malaysia (IIUM)
 National University of Malaysia (UKM)
 University of North Malaysia (UUM)
 Sultan Zainal Abidin University (UniSZA)
 Islamic Science University of Malaysia (USIM)

Private universities and colleges
 Advanced Tertiary College
 Brickfield Asia College
 KDU University College
 HELP University
 Multimedia University (MMU)
 Taylor's University
 INTI International University

Myanmar
 Dagon University
 Mandalay University
 University of Yangon
 University of Distance Education, Yangon

Pakistan 
 List of law schools in Pakistan

Philippines 
 List of law schools in the Philippines

Singapore 
 National University of Singapore - NUS Faculty of Law
 Singapore Management University - Yong Pung How School of Law
 Singapore University of Social Sciences - SUSS School of Law

South Korea 
 Law school in South Korea

Sri Lanka 
 Faculty of Law, University of Colombo
 University of Peradeniya
 Open University of Sri Lanka
 Sri Lanka Law College
 University of Jaffna

Taiwan 
 List of law schools in Taiwan

Thailand 
 Faculty of Law, Chulalongkorn University
 Faculty of Law, Thammasat University
 Faculty of Law, Ramkhamhaeng University
 Faculty of Law, Chiang Mai University
 Department of Law, Kasetsart University
 Faculty of Law, Khon Kaen University

Vietnam 
 Ho Chi Minh City University of Law      
 University of Economics, Ho Chi Minh City
 Hanoi Law University

Uzbekistan 
 Tashkent State University of Law

Australia and New Zealand 
 List of law schools in Australia
 List of law schools in New Zealand

Europe

Armenia 
 Yerevan State University - Faculty of Law
 American University of Armenia
 French University in Armenia - Faculty of law

Austria 

Johannes Kepler University - Faculty of Law, Linz
 Karl-Franzens-Universität, Graz
Universität Salzburg - Rechtswissenschaftliche Fakultät, Salzburg
University of Innsbruck - Rechtswissenschaftliche Fakultät, Innsbruck
University of Vienna - Rechtswissenschaftliche Fakultät, Vienna

Azerbaijan 
 Baku State University, Law School

Belgium 

 College of Europe - Law Department, Bruges (only postgraduate)
 Ghent University - Faculty of Law, Ghent
 Katholieke Universiteit te Leuven - Faculty of Law, Leuven
 Saint-Louis University, Brussels - Faculty of Law, Brussels
 University of Antwerp - Faculty of Law, Antwerp
 University of Hasselt - Faculty of Law, Hasselt
 University of Liège - Faculty of Law, Political Science and Criminology, Liège
 UCLouvain - Faculty of Law and Criminology, Louvain-la-Neuve
 University of Namur - Faculty of Law, Namur
 Vrije Universiteit Brussel - Faculty of Law and Criminology, Brussels

Bosnia and Herzegovina 
 University of Banja Luka - Faculty of Law
 University of Mostar Faculty of Law
 University of Sarajevo Faculty of Law
 University of Tuzla - Faculty of Law

Croatia 
 University of Osijek - Faculty of Law
 University of Rijeka - Faculty of Law
 University of Split - Faculty of Law
 University of Zagreb - Faculty of Law

Czech Republic 
 Charles University in Prague - Faculty of Law
 Masaryk University of Brno - Faculty of Law
 Palacký University of Olomouc Faculty of Law
 University of West Bohemia - Faculty of Law

Denmark 
 Copenhagen Business School - Law Department
 University of Copenhagen - Faculty of Law
 University of Aarhus - School of Law 
 University of Southern Denmark - Faculty of Social Sciences, Odense
 University of Aalborg - Department of Law

Estonia 
 Tallinn University of Technology Tallinn Law School
 University of Tartu - Faculty of Law
 Tallinn University - Law School

Finland 
 University of Helsinki - Faculty of Law
 University of Lapland - Faculty of Law, Rovaniemi
 University of Turku - Faculty of Law
 University of Eastern Finland - Department of Law, Joensuu

France 
 List of law schools in France
 List of faculties of law in France
 Collège de droit in France

Germany 
 Bucerius Law School, Hamburg
 Christian-Albrechts-Universität zu Kiel - Rechtswissenschaftliche Fakultät 
 Freie Universität Berlin
 Friedrich-Alexander-Universität - Law School, in Erlangen and Nuremberg 
 Friedrich-Schiller-Universität - Rechtswissenschaftliche Fakultät
 Gottfried Wilhelm Leibniz Universität Hannover - Faculty of Law 
 Heidelberg University Faculty of Law, University of Heidelberg
 Heinrich Heine University - Faculty of Law, Düsseldorf
 Humboldt University of Berlin
 Institute for Law and Finance, Frankfurt
 Johann Wolfgang Goethe-Universität - Fachbereich Rechtswissenschaft, Frankfurt 
 Johannes Gutenberg University of Mainz - Faculty of Law
 Julius Maximilian University of Würzburg - Juristische Fakultät
 Justus-Liebig-Universität - Department of Law, Giessen 
 Leipzig University - Faculty of Law
 Ludwig Maximilian University of Munich
 Martin-Luther-Universität Halle-Wittenberg - Juristische und Wirtschaftswissenschaftliche Fakultät 
 Philipps-Universität Marburg
 Ruhr Law School - Non-academic education centre
 Ruhr-Universität Bochum - Juristische Fakultät 
 Ruprecht-Karls-Universität Heidelberg - Juristische Fakultät
 Universität Augsburg - Law School 
 Universität Bayreuth - Rechtswissenschaften Fakultäten
 Universität Bielefeld - Rechtswissenschaften Fakultäten 
 Universität Bremen - Fachbereich Rechtswissenschaft
 Universität des Saarlandes - Faculty of Law and Economics  
 Universität Trier - Rechtswissenschaft
 University of Bonn
 University of Cologne
 University of Freiburg
 University of Göttingen
 University of Greifswald Faculty of Business and Law, Greifswald
 University of Hagen - Faculty of Law
 University of Hamburg
 Universität Konstanz - Faculty of Law, Economics and Politics 
 Universität Mannheim - Fakultät für Rechtswissenschaft und Volkswirtschaftslehre 
 University of Münster
 University of Osnabrück - Faculty of Law
 University of Passau - Faculty of Law 
 University of Potsdam - Faculty of Law
 Universität Regensburg - Juristische Fakultät 
 University of Rostock - Faculty of Law
 University of Tübingen - Faculty of Law

Greece 
 National and Kapodistrian University of Athens - School of Law 
 Aristotle University of Thessaloniki - Faculty of Law 
 Democritus University of Thrace - Department of Law

Hungary 
 Central European University- Legal Studies Department, Budapest
 Eötvös Loránd University - Faculty of Law, Budapest
 University of Miskolc - Faculty of Law
 University of Szeged - Faculty of Law
 University of Debrecen - Faculty of Law
 Károli Gáspár University of the Reformed Church in Hungary - Faculty of Law
 Pázmány Péter Catholic University - Faculty of Law and Political Sciences
 University of Pécs - Faculty of Law
 Széchenyi István University - Deák Ferenc Faculty of Law and Political Sciences

Iceland
University of Reykjavik - School of Law 
University of Iceland - Faculty of Law

Ireland 

 List of law schools in the Republic of Ireland

Italy

Kosovo 
University of Pristina - Faculty of Law (Pristina)

Latvia 
 List of law schools in Latvia

Lithuania 
 List of law schools in Lithuania

Luxembourg 
 Université de Luxembourg - Département de Droit

Malta 
University of Malta - Faculty of Laws
International Maritime Law Institute (IMLI)

Montenegro 
University of Montenegro Faculty of Law (Podgorica, Budva, Bijelo Polje)
University "Mediterranean" - Faculty of Law (Podgorica)

Netherlands
 Amsterdam Law School
 Erasmus University Rotterdam - School of Law
 Hague Academy of International Law - The Hague
 Leiden University - Faculty of Law
 Maastricht University - Faculty of Law
 Radboud University Nijmegen - Faculty of Law
 Tilburg University - Faculty of Law
 University of Amsterdam - Faculty of Law
 University of Groningen - Faculty of Law
 Utrecht University - Faculty of Law
 Vrije University Amsterdam - Faculty of Law

North Macedonia
European University Skopje - Faculty of Law (Skopje)
FON University - Faculty of Law (Skopje)
Goce Delčev University of Štip - Faculty of Law (Skopje)
Ss. Cyril and Methodius University of Skopje - Faculty of Law
International University of Struga (Struga)
State University of Tetova - Faculty of Law (Tetovo)

Norway
 University of Bergen - Faculty of Law 
 University of Oslo - Faculty of Law
 University of Tromsø - Faculty of Law

Poland
 List of law schools in Poland

Portugal
 University of Coimbra
 Portuguese Catholic University, Lisbon and Oporto
 University of Lisbon
 University of Minho, Braga
 University of Porto
 New University of Lisbon
 Universidade Lusíada de Lisboa
 Universidade Lusófona de Humanidades e Tecnologias
 Universidade Portucalense Infante Dom Henrique, Porto

Russia 

 Academic Law University under the auspices of the Institute of State and Law, Russian Academy of Sciences
 Bashkir State University - Institute of Law
 Baikal State University of Economics and Law
 Chelyabinsk State University - Faculty of Law
 Finance University under the Government of the Russian Federation - Faculty of Law
 Higher School of Economics - Faculty of Law
 Institute of Legislation and Comparative Law
 Irkutsk State University - Faculty of Law
 Kazan Federal University - Faculty of Law
 Khabarovsk State Academy of Economics and Law
 Kutafin Moscow State Law University
 Moscow State Institute of International Relations - International Law School
 Moscow State University Faculty of Law
 Novosibirsk State University - Institute for the Philosophy and Law
 Petrozavodsk State University - Faculty of Law
 Russian Peoples' Friendship University - Faculty of Law
 Russian Presidential Academy of National Economy and Public Administration – Institute of Law and National Security
 Russian State University for the Humanities - Faculty of Law
 Russian School of Private Law
 Ryazan State University - Faculty of Law
 Saint Petersburg State Polytechnical University - Faculty of Law
 Saint Petersburg State University, Faculty of Law
 Saratov State Academy of Law
 Siberian Federal University - Institute of Law
 State University of Management - Institute of Public Administration and Law
 South Ural State University - Faculty of Law
 Tomsk State University - Institute of Law
 Tyumen State University - Faculty of Law
 Ural State Law University
 Voronezh State University - Faculty of Law

Serbia 

 Belgrade Law School
 Novi Sad Law School
 Niš Law School
 University of Kragujevac, Faculty of Law
 University of Priština, Faculty of Law in North Mitrovica
 Union University, Faculty of Law (Belgrade)
 Megatrend University, Faculty of Law (Belgrade)

Slovakia 

 List of law schools in Slovakia

Slovenia
 University of Ljubljana - Faculty of Law 
 University of Maribor - Faculty of Law

Spain
 University of Castilla–La Mancha - Facultad de Derecho, Albacete
 Universidad de Allicante - Facultad de Derecho, San Vicente del Raspeig
 Universidad Autonoma de Barcelona - Facultad de Derecho 
 Universitat de Barcelona - Facultad de Dret 
 Universitat Pompeu Fabra - Facultad de Dret, Barcelona
 Universidad de Deusto - Facultad de Derecho, Bilbao
 Universidad de Extremadura - Facultad de Derecho, Cáceres 
 Universitat Jaume I - Facultad de Ciències Jurídiques i Econòmiques, Castellón
 Universidad de Cordoba - Facultad de Derecho 
 Universidad del Pais Vasco - Facultad de Derecho, Donostia - San Sebastián 
 Universitat de Girona - Facultad de Dret 
 Universidad de Granada - Facultad de Derecho 
 Universidad de Cadiz, Facultad de Derecho, Jerez de la Frontera
 Universidade da Coruña - Facultad de Dereito 
 Universidad de La Laguna - Facultad de Derecho 
 Universidad de Las Palmas de Gran Canaria - Facultad de Ciencias Jurídicas, Las Palmas
 Universidad de León - Facultad de Derecho 
 Universitat de Lleida - Facultad de Derecho 
 Universidad Autonoma de Madrid - Facultad de Derecho, Madrid
 Universidad Carlos III de Madrid - Facultad de Derecho 
 Universidad Complutense de Madrid - Facultad de Derecho, Madrid
 Universidad de Alcalá - Facultad de Derecho, Madrid 
 Universidad Nacional de Educacion a Distancia - Facultad de Derecho 
 Universidad Pontifica de Comillas - Facultad de Derecho 
 Universidad de Malaga - Facultad de Derecho 
Universidad Miguel Hernández - Facultad de Ciencias Sociales y Jurídicas, Elche
 Universidad de Murcia - Facultad de Derecho 
 University of Navarra School of Law, Pamplona
 Universidade de Vigo - Facultad de Derecho, Orense 
 Universidad de Oviedo - Facultad de Derecho 
 Universitat de les Illes Balears - Facultad de Dret, Palma, Spain 
 Universidad Rey Juan Carlos - Facultad de Ciencias Jurídicas y Sociales, Madrid; Móstoles; Fuenlabrada; Aranjuez
 Universitat Rovira i Virgili - Facultad de Ciencias Jurídicas, Tarragona
 Universidad de Salamanca - Facultad de Derecho, Salamanca
 Universidad de Cantabria - Facultad de Derecho, Santander, Spain
 Universidade de Santiago de Compostela - Facultad de Dereito 
 Universidad de Sevilla - Facultad de Derecho 
 Universidad Pablo de Olavide - School of Law, Sevilla
 Universitat de Valencia - Facultad de Derecho 
 Facultad de Derecho de la Universidad de Valladolid 
 Universidad de Zaragoza - Facultad de Derecho

Sweden 
 List of law schools in Sweden

Switzerland 
Graduate Institute of International and Development Studies, Geneva (only Postgraduate)
Universität St.Gallen - Law School
Universität Basel - Juristische Fakultät
Universität Bern - Rechtswissenschaftliche Fakultät
Université de Fribourg / Universität Freiburg - Faculté de droit / Rechtswissenschaftliche Fakultät
Université de Genève - Faculté de droit
Université de Lausanne - Faculté de droit, des sciences criminelles et d'administration publique
Universität Luzern - Rechtswissenschaftliche Fakultät
Université de Neuchâtel - Faculté de droit
Universität Zürich - Rechtswissenschaftliche Fakultät

Turkey 
 List of law schools in Turkey

Ukraine 
 List of law schools in Ukraine

United Kingdom 
 List of law faculties in the United Kingdom

Latin America and the Caribbean

Bahamas
 University of the West Indies - Eugene Dupuch Law School

Barbados
 University of the West Indies

Brazil
 List of law schools in Brazil

Cayman Islands
 Cayman Islands Law School (School of Law)

Chile 

 Universidad de Chile - Facultad de Derecho
 Pontificia Universidad Católica de Chile - Facultad de Derecho
 Universidad Adolfo Ibañez - Facultad de Derecho

Costa Rica 
 Universidad de Costa Rica (School of Law)
 Universidad Autónoma de Centro América (School of Law)
 Universidad de San José (University with a Faculty of Law)

Ecuador
 Pontificia Universidad Católica del Ecuador (School of Law)
 Universidad Catolica Santiago de Guayaquil (School of Law)
 Universidad Central del Ecuador (School of Law)
 Universidad de Especialidades Espíritu Santo (School of Law)
 Universidad San Francisco de Quito (College of Law)
 Universidad Del Pacifico - Ecuador (School of Law)

Jamaica
 University of the West Indies - Norman Manley Law School

Panama
 Universidad Latinoamericana de Ciencia y Tecnología (School of Law)

Trinidad and Tobago
 University of the West Indies - Hugh Wooding Law School

North America 
 List of law schools in Canada
 List of law schools in the United States
 List of law schools in Mexico

See also 

 Legal education
 Lists of universities and colleges
 Madrasa

References

 
Law school